Orenhofen is a municipality in the district of Bitburg-Prüm, in Rhineland-Palatinate, western Germany.

References

Bitburg-Prüm